Buttar Sarinh , incorrect spellings include Buttar Shrin and Buttar Shri, is a small village in the Giddarbaha tehsil of Sri Muktsar Sahib district in Punjab, India. It's located on the Sri Muktsar Sahib-Bathinda main road.

Geography

The city and district of Bathinda (31 km) lies to its southeast, Sri Muktsar Sahib (21 km) to the northwest and Faridkot district to the north. The Indian airforce base of Bhisiana lies just 11 km to the southeast and the state capital city of Chandigarh is 253 km to the east. Chhattiana (3 km), Lohara (3.5 km), Dhulkot (4 km) and Doda (6 km) are the surrounding villages.

Culture 

Punjabi is the mother tongue as well as the official language of the village, predominated by the Jatt people of Buttar clan.

Religion 

As of religion, the village is predominated by the Sikhs, the followers of Sikhism with other minorities. A Gurudwara Sahib, on the main road, is the primary religious site. Dera Baba Bawa Sahib is also the place of religious respect in the memory of a Sant known as Baba Bawa Sahib.

Demographics 

As of 2001 census, total population of the village is 1,967 with 313 households, 1,033 males and 934 females. Thus males constitute 52.5% and females 47.5% of the total population with the sex ratio of 904 females per thousand males.

Climate

The western Himalayas in the north, Thar Desert in the southwest and monsoon mainly determines the climate.

Economy

As is common in the Punjab region, agriculture is the main occupation of the locals and main source of income as well. The main crops of the village are, wheat and cotton. Rice growing is started few years ago in the area. As of irrigation, Monsoon greatly affects the agriculture in the region as nearly 70% of the rain falls in July–September by the Monsoon while people use canal and tube wells also.

The few Hindu families have their small shops and general stores.

See also 
Akkan Wali
Buttar
Buttar Kalan
Kokri Buttran
Lakhmir Wala
Raipur

References 

Villages in Sri Muktsar Sahib district